János or Janos may refer to:
 János, male Hungarian given name, a variant of John

Places
 Janos Municipality, a municipality of Chihuahua
 Janos, Chihuahua, town in Mexico
 Janos Biosphere Reserve, a nature reserve in Chihuahua
 Janos Trail, trade route from New Mexico to Janos

People
 James Janos (born 1951), legal birth name of Jesse Ventura
 János Aczél (mathematician) (1924–2020), Hungarian-Canadian mathematician
 János Adorján (1938–1995), former Hungarian handball player
 János Aknai (1908–1992), Hungarian footballer
 János Arany (1817–1882), Hungarian writer, poet
 János Balogh (biologist) (1913–2002), Hungarian zoologist, ecologist, and professor
 János Balogh (chess player) (1892–1980), Hungarian–Romanian chess master
 János Balogh (footballer) (born 1982), Hungarian football goalkeeper
 Janos Bardi (1923–1990)
 János Bartl (1878–1958), magic supply dealer
 János Batsányi (1763–1845), Hungarian poet
 János Bédl (1929–1987), Hungarian football manager
 János Bencze (basketball) (1934–2014), Hungarian basketball player
 János Bergou (born 1947), Hungarian physicist and academic
 János Beszteri-Balogh (born 1938), former Hungarian ice hockey player
 János Bethlen (1613–1678), Chancellor of Transylvania
 János Bihari (1764–1827), Hungarian Romani violinist
 János Biri (1901–1983), Hungarian footballer and coach
 János Bódi (born 1932), Hungarian modern pentathlete
 János Bogár (born 1964), Hungarian ultramarathon runner
 János Bognár (1914–2004), Hungarian cyclist
 János Bókai (1822–1884), Hungarian professor, pediatrician, and children's hospital director
 János Boldóczki (1912–1988), Hungarian politician
 János Bolyai (1802–1860), Hungarian mathematician
 János Borsó (born 1953), Hungarian international football player
 János Börzsei (1921–2007), former Hungarian footballer
 János Brenner (1931–1957), Hungarian Roman Catholic priest
 János Bud (1880–1950), Hungarian politician
 János Csák (born 1962), Hungarian corporate leader and ambassador
 János Csank (born 1946), former goalkeeper and football manager
 János Cserni (born 1971), Hungarian judge and journalist
 János Cseszneky (1535-1593), Hungarian magnate
 János Csík (born 1946), Hungarian handball player and handball coach
 János Czetz (1822–1904), prominent Hungarian freedom fighter
 János Dalmati (born 1942), Hungarian racewalker
 Janos Delacruz (born 1985), Filipino painter, illustrator, etcher, and printmaker
 János Derzsi (born 1954), Hungarian actor
 János Dévai (1940–2006), Hungarian cyclist
 János Donát (1744–1830), German-born Hungarian painter
 János Dosztály (1920–1998), Hungarian sports shooter
 János Drágffy (?-1526), Judge Royal of the Kingdom of Hungary
 János Drapál (1948–1985), Grand Prix motorcycle road racer from Budapest
 János Dudás (1911–1979), Hungarian football midfielder
 János Dzvonyár (born 1961), Hungarian swimmer
 János Eilingsfeld (born 1991), Hungarian basketball player
 János Erdei (1919–1997), Hungarian boxer
 János Farkas (1741–1788), Hungarian jurist, lawyer and landowner
 János Farkas (1774–1847), Hungarian nobleman, jurist, landowner, vice-ispán 
 János Farkas (footballer, born 1984), Hungarian football player
 János Fuzik (1957–2022), Hungarian journalist and politician
 János Garay (fencer) (1889–1945), Hungarian Olympic champion saber fencer
 Janos Mohoss (1936–2020), Swiss fencer
 János Murányi (born 1944), Hungarian discus thrower
 János Neumann (John von Neumann) (1903–1957), Hungarian born American mathematician, computer scientist
 Janos Pasztor (diplomat) (born 1955), Hungarian diplomat
 Janos Ruthaly (1875–1963), American light heavyweight boxing champion, better known as "Jack Root"
 János Scholz (1903–1993), Hungarian-born American cellist and art collector
 Janos Spiegel (1876–1956), Hungarian violin maker
 János Starker (1924–2013), Hungarian-American cellist
 Janos Sztipanovits (born 1946), electrical engineer and computer scientist
 János Uzsoki (born 1972), Hungarian long jumper

Characters
 Janos Audron, introduced in the 1996 game Blood Omen
 Janos Skorzeny, a vampire in the 1972 television film The Night Stalker
 Janos Skorzeny, a werewolf in the 1987-88 television series Werewolf
 Janos Slynt, Commander of the City Watch in George Martin's A Song of Ice and Fire

Hungarian masculine given names